Juwana Morto is former coastal artillery battery on the island of Aruba. It was used to defend Aruba during World War II. It is located toward the south end of the island, within the district of San Nicolaas. Most of the building has been demolished, and only the foundation remains.

References

Coastal artillery
Fortifications in Aruba
Buildings and structures in San Nicolaas